The SZD-10 Czapla  (Szybowcowy Zakład Doświadczalny - Glider Experimental Works) was a two-seat training glider aircraft that was designed and built in Poland from 1953.

Development 
The Czapla (Heron) was a tandem two-seat training glider, with a strut- supported, forward-swept, high-set wing and a welded steel tube fuselage with fabric covering. Design of the Czapla commenced in 1952 to the order of the Soldier's Friends' League paramilitary organization, to enable aeroclubs to train glider pilots in a two-seat trainee/instructor system. Main designers were Roman Zatwarnicki, Irena Kaniewska and Marian Gracz. The Czapla was designed to be launched by bungee, winch or aero-tow, and the prototype first flew on 23 November 1953, demonstrating the need for several improvements, which were introduced in the second prototype (flown on 26 March 1954) and the production model SZD-10bis Czapla. Production was carried out from 1955 at ZSLS (ZSLS - sport aviation equipment workshops) in Krosno, Wrocław, Bielsko and Poznań and the Military Repair workshop at Łódź, with Czapla being used for everyday club flying up to the early 1980s, and exported to Finland and Turkey.

Variants
SZD-10-2 Czapla – two prototypes
SZD-10bis Czapla – 19 production aircraft
SZD-10bis A Czapla – 136 production aircraft, first flew in June 1958

Specifications (SZD-10bis Czapla)

See also

References

Taylor, J. H. (ed) (1989) Jane's Encyclopedia of Aviation. Studio Editions: London. p. 29

External links

https://www.youtube.com/watch?v=5mOxE3ZbVbE
http://www.airplane-pictures.net/type.php?p=2121
http://muzeumlotnictwa.pl/zbiory_sz.php?ido=90&w=a
http://www.piotrp.de/SZYBOWCE/pszd10.htm
http://www.aeroklub.wroc.pl/node/114
http://www.aeroklub.wroc.pl/node/115
http://www.aeroklub.wroc.pl/node/38
http://www.aeroklub.wroc.pl/node/126
http://www.aeroklub.wroc.pl/node/124

1950s Polish sailplanes
SZD10
SZD aircraft
Aircraft first flown in 1953